The Gatehouse Mausoleum is a building located in Parkville, Melbourne, Australia.

It was designed by Philip Harmer of Harmer Architecture, and sits tucked under the existing historical gatehouse along College Crescent in Parkville. It was constructed in 2004 and took 9 months to complete.

It is the fourth mausoleum built by Harmer Architecture, built to extend the Melbourne General Cemetery, the first modern burial site in Melbourne with over 500,000 interments since its inception in the 1850s. The Gatehouse Mausoleum adds an addition 618 burial spaces and was designed with Melbourne Italian community in mind. 
The adjacent gate to which it connects was built by John Growler from 1934 to 1935 and opens onto College Crescent.

Description
The site is awkward, tucked into the area between the existing gatehouse and the curve of Princess Park Drive, which guides the curve of the fan-shaped roof. From Princess Park Drive visitors can experience the undulating angles of the roof, which comes to a point as the site tightens. The roof is corrugated, a nod towards traditional Australian architecture, and is punctuated with irregular skylights that serve as the only light for the interior space. This creates a sense of otherworldly light within the space, emphasizing the spiritual aspects of the crypts.

The ceiling is made of plywood panels which emphasize the angles of the fan roof, blurring the line between interior and exterior space within the site. The crosses on the ceiling were designed by Philip Harmer and Andrew Ferguson, of Stained Glass Art, and were made handmade or mouth-blown stained glass. The only source of electronic light in the space are security lights.

Between the gatehouse and the mausoleum is an expanse of glass punctuated with thin vertical columns. The glass ceiling is frosted and patterned with clear crosses. As the light passes through these and falls upon the paved floor it invokes images of military burial sites and their rows of pale crosses. The mausoleum itself is tucked just under the roof line of the gatehouse creating a connection between the two separate structures, yet encouraging flow between them.

The exterior is composed primarily of polished granite and custom made pyramid shaped bricks which add a contrasting set of textures to the façade. Three rows of walls run from east to west on the site and demarcate and divide the galleries within, while the colour of the pyramid bricks is reminiscent of the tiles on the historical gatehouse beside the mausoleum creating a visual connection between the two exteriors. From the gate the view is of three overlapping walls distinguished by a series of cast bronze panels, each its own gallery. The galleries offer serene views of the cemetery beyond. Each has a stainless steel mesh gate with black steel frames to close it at the end of the day, the only real means of dividing the crypts from the outside.

The granite shutters of the crypts are made of the same blocks of granite as the exterior, but polished to a higher shine to demarcate a change in space. Each features area enough for a plaque and small holders for flowers to honor those who are resting within.

Design Intent
The main parties interested in the construction of the site included Heritage Victorian, the Melbourne City Council Planning and Urban Design Departments, and the National Trust. As well as this, the mausoleum was intended for the Italian community in Melbourne. In the brief it was required that the site have the maximum return within the constraints of both the site and the heritage trustees who oversaw the project.

The result is a structure with a “strong simplicity of structure infuse with fine architectural details”. For spiritual and serene places like this there is a need for minimal maintenance, through the highly refined yet solid surfaces and structure, as well as permanence and weight, as for many a mausoleum needs to stand strong as a symbol of permanence and life in a place intended to house the dead. There is a stillness in the solidity of the granite and brick, while the ceiling points continuously upward in silent reverence.

Awards
 RAIA Award for Institutional Alterations and Extensions

References

External links
 Harmer Architects
 Project webpage
 "Architecture Australia"
 Specifier
 Australian Institute of Architects

Buildings and structures in the City of Melbourne (LGA)
Mausoleums in Australia
2004 establishments in Australia
Buildings and structures completed in 2004